The 2023 Colorado State Rams football team  represents Colorado State University in the 2023 NCAA Division I FBS football season. The Rams are led by second-year head coach Jay Norvell and play their home games at Sonny Lubick Field at Canvas Stadium in Fort Collins, Colorado, as members of the Mountain Division of the Mountain West Conference.

Schedule

References

Colorado State
Sports in Colorado
Colorado State Rams football seasons